The FFA Australian Football Awards is an awards ceremony held for the best Australian association football players. The ceremony has been held annually since 2010.

Male footballer of the year

Female Footballer of the Year

Male U20 Footballer of the Year

Female U20 Footballer of the Year

See also
List of A-League honours
PFA Footballer of the Year Awards

References
FFA.com.au Australian Football Awards

Football Australia
Australian soccer trophies and awards